The following is a list of chapters for the light novel, and manga series Shomin Sample.

Light novel
Special editions were made for volumes 5, 7, and 10 which were released on the same dates as their counterparts.

Manga
A special edition was made of the seventh volume.

Spinoff

References

External links
Official website 
Shomin Sample manga at Seven Seas Entertainment

Shomin Sample